Prince Lee Boo or Lebu (1764 – 27 December 1784) was the second son of Abba Thulle (Ibedul), the ruler of Koror in the Pelew Islands, now called Palau. Prince Lee Boo was one of the first people from the Pacific Islands to visit Great Britain. When the China trader Antelope, on a voyage to China for the East India Company,  was wrecked on the island of Oroolong in Western Palau in 1783, its survivors, including Captain Henry Wilson, spent three months on Palau. When the survivors were finally rescued, Captain Wilson agreed to take Lee Boo to London to acquire more knowledge about Europe. He arrived about a decade after the Tahitian Omai, on 14 July 1784, in Portsmouth, aboard the Morse, and was quickly dubbed "The Black Prince" by London society, who were charmed by his poise and intelligence. The Wilson family took him into their home in London, where he attended church ceremonies, dinner parties and European school for several months. However, he died of smallpox on 27 December 1784, some six months after his arrival in London. He was 20 years old.

He was buried at St Mary's Church, Rotherhithe.

Prince Lee Boo's story appeared in a book by George Keate (1729–97), titled: An Account of the Pelew Islands, Situated in the Western Part of the Pacific Ocean. Composed from the Journals and Communications of Captain Henry Wilson, and some of his Officers, who, in August 1783, were there Shipwrecked, in the Antelope, a Packet belonging to the Hon. East India Company. The author's daughter, Georgiana Jane Keate (1770–1850, later Mrs. Georgiana Henderson), painted the portrait of Prince Lee Boo in the book. It was painted from memory, fifteen months after Prince Lee Boo's death.

This book was quite popular. It was translated into over 20 languages between 1789 and 1850.

An abridged version, titled: The Interesting History of Prince Lee Boo, Brought to England from the Pelew Islands, is available online.

References 

1764 births
1784 deaths
History of Palau
History of London
People from Rotherhithe
Palauan expatriates in the United Kingdom
People from Koror
Deaths from smallpox
Infectious disease deaths in England